Smoky Hill Township is a township in Geary County, Kansas, USA.  As of the 2000 census, its population was 4,974.

History
Smoky Hill Township was organized in 1872.

Geography
According to the USGS, it contains three cemeteries: Alda, Alida and Saint Johns.

The streams of Curtis Creek, Fourmile Creek, Onemile Creek, Republican River, School Creek and Smoky Hill River run through this township.

Transportation
Smoky Hill Township contains one airport or landing strip, Ritter Airport (historical).

References

 USGS Geographic Names Information System (GNIS)

Further reading

External links
 City-Data.com

Townships in Geary County, Kansas
Townships in Kansas